The women's field hockey tournament at the 1996 Summer Olympics was the 5th edition of the field hockey event for women at the Summer Olympic Games. It was held over a thirteen-day period beginning on 20 July, and culminating with the medal finals on 1 August. Games were played at the Herndon Stadium and the Panther Stadium, both located in Atlanta, United States.

Australia won the gold medal for the second time after defeating Korea 3–1 in the final. The Netherlands won the bronze medal by defeating Great Britain 4–3 in the final on penalty strokes after a 0–0 draw.

Qualification
The previous Olympic and World champions and the host nation received an automatic berth. Along with the five teams qualifying through the Olympic Qualification Tournament, eight teams competed in this tournament.

Squads

Umpires

Results
All times are Eastern Daylight Time (UTC−04:00)

Preliminary round

Medal round

Bronze medal match

Gold medal match

Statistics

Final ranking

Scorers

8 goals
 Alyson Annan
 Chang Eun-jung

7 goals
 Wietske de Ruiter

6 goals
 Cho Eun-jung

4 goals
 Katrina Powell
 Jane Sixsmith
 Mijntje Donners

3 goals
 Danielle Roche
 Jenn Morris
 Lisa Powell
 Michelle Andrews
 Britta Becker
 Franziska Hentschel
 Marcia Pankratz

2 goals
 Jorgelina Rimoldi
 Karina Masotta
 Sofía MacKenzie
 Jill Atkins
 Mandy Nicholls
 Vanessa van Kooperen
 Ellen Kuipers
 Barbara Marois

1 goal
 María Castelli
 Kate Starre
 Rechelle Hawkes
 Renita Farrell
 Lucía López
 Maider Tellería
 Nagore Gabellanes
 Natalia Dorado
 Sonia Barrio
 Christine Cook
 Kathryn Johnson
 Rhona Simpson
 Susan Fraser
 Heike Lätzsch
 Melanie Cremer
 Choi Mi-soon
 Kwon Chang-sook
 Kwon Soo-hyun
 Lee Eun-kyung
 Lee Eun-young
 Carole Thate
 Jeannette Lewin
 Cindy Werley
 Liz Tchou
 Tracey Fuchs

References

External links

Women's Tournament
1996
1996 Summer Olympics - Women's tournament
1996 in women's field hockey
Field